Igor Andreyevich Zolotovskiy (born 12 June 1995) is a Russian football player.

He made his debut in the Russian Football National League for FC Shinnik Yaroslavl on 21 May 2016 in a game against FC Baltika Kaliningrad.

References

External links
 Profile by Russian Football National League

1995 births
Footballers from Yaroslavl
Living people
Russian footballers
Association football defenders
FC Shinnik Yaroslavl players